The Burjanadze-Democrats was an election bloc in the republic of Georgia in 2003. They were led by and named after Nino Burjanadze. Other famous members of this bloc included the late Zurab Zhvania, Gigi Tsereteli, and Eldar Shengelaia.  
Burjanadze now leads the Democratic Movement–United Georgia.

Politics of Georgia (country)
2003 establishments in Georgia (country)